Industrial Spy: Operation Espionage or I Spy, known in Japan as , is a video game developed by HuneX, published by NEC Home Electronics and UFO Interactive Games for Dreamcast in 1999-2000.

Reception

The game received unfavorable reviews according to the review aggregation website GameRankings. Jeff Lundrigan of NextGen said in an early review, "Industrial Spy isn't bad, by any means. The graphics are good, and many of the characters are more fleshed out than they first appear. Mostly though, the game makes you look forward to I Spy 2, when hopefully [the developers have] worked out the kinks." (Ironically, there was never a sequel to the game itself.)

References

External links
 

1999 video games
Dreamcast games
Dreamcast-only games
Multiplayer and single-player video games
Spy video games
HuneX games
UFO Interactive Games games
Video games developed in Japan